Lithurgus chrysurus, the Mediterranean wood-boring bee, is a species of woodborer bee in the family Megachilidae.

References

Further reading

External links
 

Megachilidae
Articles created by Qbugbot
Insects described in 1834